Shah Spit  is a spit which is located in the far south-eastern part of the Absheron Peninsula. It is the largest spit in Azerbaijan. Moreover, Shah Spit is easternmost land of Azerbaijan on the mainland. Administratively, Baku is located in the territory of Zira settlement.

Geographical features 

The spit extends throughout the Caspian sea, to the south. It has a narrow and long shape. The area is mostly sandy. It is not so high above from sea level. For this reason, saline groundwater is close to the surface. Saline ponds and swamp lands are widespread. The climate of spit is characterized by strong winds.

Absheron National Park 

The area of spit is completely included in the territory of Absheron National Park. The main purpose of the establishment of the Absheron National Park was to protect the environment and protection of endangered rare species of flora and fauna. There are Caspian seals, gazelles, partridges, Caspian seagulls, green-headed ducks and others are preserved.

References 

Peninsulas of Azerbaijan